Percy Lord Tompkin (born 28 January 1894) was a professional footballer who played for Huddersfield Town and Leicester City.

References

1894 births
1950 deaths
English footballers
Footballers from Salford
Association football midfielders
English Football League players
Huddersfield Town A.F.C. players
Leicester City F.C. players